The Next Issue Project is a series of American comic-book anthology one-shots published by Image Comics beginning in February 2008. The multi-title project, edited by Erik Larsen, creator of Savage Dragon, features comic book characters that have fallen into the public domain.

The premise behind the series, according to Larsen, is:

Publication history 
Each issue of the Next Issue Project utilizes features from a title published during the 1930s and 1940s period historians and fans call the Golden Age of Comic Books, with similar dimensions and page count, both larger than the modern-day standard. Each issue continues the name and numbering of each title.

The first issue, Fantastic Comics #24 came out in February 2008. It was followed by Silver Streak Comics #24 in December 2009 and later Crack Comics #63.

Issues

Fantastic Comics #24 
Continuing from Fox Feature Syndicate's Fantastic Comics. This issue was released on February 13, 2008. It contained the following stories:
 Samson, written and illustrated by Erik Larsen
 Flip Falcon, written by Joe Casey and illustrated by Bill Sienkiewicz
 Golden Knight, co-written and illustrated by Thomas Yeates and Bryan Rutherford
 Yank Wilson, written and illustrated by Andy Kuhn
 Space Smith, written and illustrated by Tom Scioli
 Captain Kidd, written and illustrated by Jim Rugg
 Professor Fiend, written and illustrated by Fred Hembeck
 Sub Saunders, written and illustrated by Ashley Wood
 Stardust the Super Wizard, written by Joe Keatinge and illustrated by Mike Allred
 a prose piece featuring Carlton Riggs by B. Clay Moore with illustration by Jason Latour

Silver Streak Comics #24 
Continuing from Lev Gleason Publications' Silver Streak Comics. Released in December, 2009. It contained the following stories:
 Daredevil, written and illustrated by Erik Larsen
 Silver Streak, written and illustrated by Paul Grist
 Kelly the Cop, written and illustrated by Joe Keatinge
 The Claw, written and illustrated by Michael T. Gilbert
 Captain Battle, written by Steve Horton and illustrated by Alan Weiss

Crack Comics #63 
Continuing from Quality Comics' Crack Comics. This issue was released on November 2, 2011. It contained the following stories:
 Captain Triumph, written and penciled by Alan Weiss
 The Space Legion, written and illustrated by Chris Burnham
 The Clock, written and illustrated by Paul Maybury
 Molly the Model, written and illustrated by Terry Austin
 Alias the Spider, written and illustrated by Adam McGovern and Paolo Leandri
 Spitfire, written and illustrated by Herb Trimpe
 Slap Happy Pappy, written and illustrated by Joe Keatinge
 Hack O'Hara (with a cameo by the Space Legion), written and illustrated by Erik Larsen
 Red Torpedo, written and illustrated by B. Clay Moore, Frank Fosco, Erik Larsen

Speed Comics #45 
Continuing from Harvey Comics' Speed Comics, it features Shock Gibson, Captain Freedom and War Nurse.

Notes

References 

Public domain comics